My American History: Lesbian and Gay Life During The Reagan/Bush Years is a 1994 collection of journalism by Sarah Schulman. The book includes a reprint of Lesbian Avenger Handbook, a 24-page guide for activists.

References

Further reading

  consideration of My American History on pages 26–28
 
 

1995 non-fiction books
1990s LGBT literature
American non-fiction books
Books about LGBT history
LGBT literature in the United States
Routledge books